The 1995–96 Bundesliga was the 33rd season of the Bundesliga, Germany's premier football league. It began on 11 August 1995 and ended on 18 May 1996. Borussia Dortmund were the defending champions.

Competition modus
Every team played two games against each other team, one at home and one away. This was the first season where teams received three points for a win (instead of two), and one point for a draw. If two or more teams were tied on points, places were determined by goal difference and, if still tied, by goals scored. The team with the most points were crowned champions while the three teams with the fewest points were relegated to 2. Bundesliga.

Team changes to 1994–95
VfL Bochum and MSV Duisburg were relegated to the 2. Bundesliga after finishing in 16th and 17th place respectively. Dynamo Dresden, who ended the season in last place, were denied a professional license by the DFB and thus relegated to the third-tier Regionalliga. All demoted teams were replaced by 2. Bundesliga sides F.C. Hansa Rostock, FC St. Pauli and Fortuna Düsseldorf.

Bayer 05 Uerdingen were renamed KFC Uerdingen 05 due to the retreat of main sponsor Bayer.

Season overview

Team overview

League table

Results

Top goalscorers
17 goals
  Fredi Bobic (VfB Stuttgart)

16 goals
  Sean Dundee (Karlsruher SC)
  Giovane Élber (VfB Stuttgart)
  Jürgen Klinsmann (FC Bayern Munich)

15 goals
  Martin Dahlin (Borussia Mönchengladbach)
  Michael Zorc (Borussia Dortmund)

14 goals
  Olaf Bodden (TSV 1860 Munich)
  Harald Spörl (Hamburger SV)

11 goals
  Mario Basler (SV Werder Bremen)
  Stefan Beinlich (F.C. Hansa Rostock)
  Harry Decheiver (SC Freiburg)
  Martin Max (FC Schalke 04)
  Erik Meijer (KFC Uerdingen 05)
  Toni Polster (1. FC Köln)

Champion squad

References

External links
 DFB Bundesliga archive 1995/1996

Bundesliga seasons
1
Germany